Feri Lainšček (born 5 October 1959) is a Slovenian writer, poet, and screenwriter.

Early life
He was born Franc Lainšček in a Slovene Lutheran family in the village of Dolenci (part of Šalovci), in northeastern Slovenia, then part of the Socialist Federal Republic of Yugoslavia. He studied journalism at the University of Ljubljana. In the 1980s, he worked as a speaker at Radio Ljubljana. Since the 1990s, he has been living and working in the town of Murska Sobota in his native Prekmurje region.

Work
In 1999, he wrote a novel, which is a story of the screenplay for the film Rooster's Breakfast, the most successful Slovenian film to date. The screenplay of the film is based on one of Lainšček's novels.

In the parliamentary elections of 2008, Lainšček ran for the Slovenian National Assembly for the social liberal party Zares.

Lainšček has also created works in Prekmurje Slovene, professed a Prekmurje identity, and claimed that the Prekmurje dialect is a distinct language.

References 

1959 births
Living people
People from the Municipality of Šalovci
Slovenian Lutherans
Zares politicians
Slovenian novelists
Slovenian poets
Slovenian male poets
Slovenian screenwriters
Male screenwriters
University of Ljubljana alumni
Kresnik Award laureates